Luigi Alois Hirschbühl (1883–1950)  was a Swiss painter
and commander of the Pontifical Swiss Guard from 1921 to 1935.
Born in Chur as the son of Anton Hirschbühl, a painter and immigrant from Riefensberg, Vorarlberg and of Walpurga née Willi, of Domat. He married Claudia née Zanolari, of  Brusio, and was naturalized as Swiss citizen.
He served with the Pontifical Swiss Guard before spending the year 1904 with the study of painting in Minca.
He re-entered the Swiss Guard in the rank of captain in 1910, promoted to major in 1914 and to lieutenant colonel in 1920, before being promoted to colonel (commander of the guard) in 1921.

References	
P.M. Krieg, Die Schweizergarde in Rom (1960, 2nd ed. 2006), 406–410.
Lexicon Istoric Retic (LIR)
SIKART Lexikon zur Kunst in der Schweiz

1883 births
1950 deaths
Commanders of the Swiss Guard
19th-century Swiss painters
19th-century male artists
20th-century Swiss painters
20th-century male artists